The Český svaz orientačních sportů (ČSOS) is the national Orienteering Association in Czech Republic. It is recognized as the orienteering association for the Czech Republic by the International Orienteering Federation, of which it is a member.

History
Czechoslovakia was among the ten founding members of the International Orienteering Federation in 1961 and participated in the first European Orienteering Championships in 1962. The 1972 World Orienteering Championships were held in Doksy, and the 1991 championships were held in Mariánské Lázně in then Czechoslovakia (current Czech Republic). The 2008 World Championships were hosted in Olomouc in the Czech Republic.

In 2012, the Czech Republic won gold medals in the men's relay in the World Championships.

See also 
 Czech orienteers

References

External links
 Official website of the Český svaz orientačních sportů (ČSOS)

Sport in the Czech Republic
International Orienteering Federation members
Orienteering in the Czech Republic